WBMS may refer to:

Web Business Management System
WBMS (AM), a radio station in Brockton, Massachusetts
WBMS-CA, a television station in Jackson, Mississippi
the original call sign of WILD (AM), a radio station in Boston, Massachusetts
the former call sign of WZGM, a radio station in Black Mountain, North Carolina
A German Bacchanalian fraternity, called Weinbruderschaft Mittelrhein-Siebengebirge (Rheinweinbruderschaft)